is a Japanese manga series written by Hiroaki Igano and illustrated by Kaya Tsukiyama. It was  serialized in Kodansha's shōnen manga magazine Weekly Shōnen Magazine from April 2006 to March 2017, with its chapters collected in 57 tankōbon volumes. A 37-episode anime television series adaptation by Shin-Ei Animation was broadcast on TV Asahi from January to September 2012.

Plot
Kakeru Aizawa is the younger brother to Suguru Aizawa, a soccer prodigy belonging to Japan's under–15 national team. Prior to the series, Kakeru quits his position as a forward after a traumatic experience prevented him from playing with his left leg and settles for a managerial position. After the two are hit by a truck, Suguru dies and has his heart transplanted into Kakeru. With it, Kakeru returns to soccer to achieve his brother's dream of winning the World Cup.

Characters

Suguru's younger brother. He plays as a forward. As a sixth grader, and after causing an injury on his friend and teammate Hibino by shooting hard the ball with his left foot, he becomes wary of using it which seriously hinders his ability to score and particularly his confidence, to the point that he seems to be unable to score. As a consequence, he starts to play less and less often and starts working more as assistant manager, to the exasperation of his brother, ace Suguru. Nonetheless, he keeps practicing soccer secretly in the park every night.
Things began to change as his childhood friend and old crush, Mishima Nana, returns to Japan one day and becomes the team's manager. Further, a mysterious masked man appears one night at the park and challenges him to play, which they keep doing every night. This motivates Kakeru to try again at the team, and in a practice match he is the only forward to be able to keep up with Suguru’s sudden and strong passes, but he fails to score because of his fear of using his left leg. Feeling disappointed he tells his brother he’ll give up on soccer just minutes before they’re both hit by a truck. After he recovers from the accident and from the heart transplant he received from his brother as his "last pass", Kakeru discovers that he seems to have inherited some of Suguru’s skills and temperament, and that he can use his left leg again.
The masked man is revealed to be Nana, who had been asked by Suguru to help Kakeru, and she reveals to him that his transplant came from his brother. After learning that and finding out that his brother’s dream was that both of them would win the World Cup he decides to return to soccer and make his brother’s dream reality.

Kakeru's older brother. Suguru was a genius midfielder and captain of the school soccer team, who even starred in the U-15 team for Japan. He was expected by many to shoulder the future of Japan's football world. He was aware of his little brother's talent as a soccer player and was irritated by Kakeru's lack of motivation. It is hinted in the manga that Suguru might have somehow predicted his own death, as he started having regular nightmares, which ended the day of his death. After hearing his brother's decision to give up on soccer, he is about to tell him about the great dream he had that morning, when both of them are run by a truck whose driver fell asleep. Suguru had the worse part, and it was soon obvious that he was beyond help. Knowing this and also that Kakeru would need a heart transplant to survive, the doctors and the family decide to have his heart transplanted to Kakeru, who accordingly dreams that Suguru is giving him a final pass. Giving his heart to Kakeru, he also gives him his dream of winning the world cup.

A childhood friend of Suguru and Kakeru, nicknamed Seven. Since returning from Los Angeles, she has become a manager, like Kakeru. She is skilled in soccer and has a relation to Kakeru.

	

		

Aizawa's Father

Aizawa's Mother

Media

Manga

Written by Hiroaki Igano and illustrated by Kaya Tsukiyama, The Knight in the Area was serialized in Kodansha's shōnen manga magazine Weekly Shōnen Magazine from April 26, 2006, to March 29, 2017. Kodansha collected its chapters in 57 tankōbon volumes, released from August 17, 2006, to May 17, 2017.

Anime

A 37-episode anime television series, produced by Shin-Ei Animation and directed by Hirofumi Ogura, was broadcast on TV Asahi from January 7 to September 29, 2012.

The series was simulcasted by Crunchyroll in the United States, Canada, the United Kingdom, Ireland, South Africa, Australia, and New Zealand.

Reception
By August 2021, the manga had over 13 million copies in circulation.

References

External links
  
  
 

Anime series based on manga
Association football in anime and manga
Kodansha manga
Shin Kibayashi
Shin-Ei Animation
Shōnen manga
TV Asahi original programming